Voshchar is a rural locality (a settlement) in Spasskoye Rural Settlement, Tarnogsky District, Vologda Oblast, Russia. The population was 314 as of 2002.

Geography 
Voshchar is located 38 km northwest of Tarnogsky Gorodok (the district's administrative centre) by road. Spassky Pogost is the nearest rural locality.

References 

Rural localities in Tarnogsky District